Frank Henry Connaughton  (January 1, 1869 – December 1, 1942) was a Major League Baseball shortstop and outfielder. His professional career lasted from 1891 to 1913 and included three brief stints as a minor league baseball manager.

In 146 games over three seasons, Connaughton posted a .283 batting average (150-for-530) with 98 runs, 4 home runs, 77 RBI, 26 stolen bases and 44 bases on balls.

External links

Boston Beaneaters players
New York Giants (NL) players
19th-century baseball players
Major League Baseball shortstops
Major League Baseball outfielders
Baseball players from Massachusetts
1869 births
1942 deaths
Savannah Electrics players
Savannah Rabbits players
Brockton Shoemakers players
Kansas City Blues (baseball) players
New York Metropolitans (minor league) players
Worcester Farmers players
Worcester Hustlers players
Montreal Royals players
Worcester Riddlers players
Haverhill Hustlers players
Toledo Mud Hens players
Harrisburg Senators players
Lawrence Colts players
Lynn Shoemakers players
Waterbury Finnegans players
New Bedford Whalers (baseball) players
Bangor Maroons players
Minor league baseball managers
Woonsocket (minor league baseball) players